St. Vladimir's Cathedral is a Ukrainian Catholic cathedral located in Stamford, Connecticut.  It is the seat for the Eparchy of Stamford. The parish was established in 1916, and the simple brick Romanesque Revival-inspired church building was completed in 1957.

See also
List of Catholic cathedrals in the United States
List of cathedrals in the United States

References

External links

Christian organizations established in 1916
Churches completed in 1957
Ukrainian-American culture in Connecticut
Eastern Catholic churches in Connecticut
Ukrainian Catholic cathedrals in the United States
Churches in Stamford, Connecticut
Romanesque Revival church buildings in Connecticut
Catholic cathedrals in Connecticut